Embryonic Journey is an album by Jorma Kaukonen, the lead guitarist for Jefferson Airplane / Hot Tuna, and former Grateful Dead keyboardist Tom Constanten. The album consists of studio sessions for the recording of Kaukonen's instrumental Embryonic Journey for the Constanten album Morning Dew. The song had originally appeared on Jefferson Airplane's Surrealistic Pillow album in 1967.  A version of the song employing MIDI technology was added as a bonus track.

Track listing
"Embryonic Journey: Jorma Solo" – 4:36 
"Embryonic Journey  Jorma and Tom Take No. 1" – 2:44 
"Embryonic Journey: Different Voicing" – 3:06 
"Embryonic Journey: Going for It" – 2:30 
"Embryonic Journey: Doing a Quick One" – 3:10 
"Embryonic Journey: One, Two, Three, Four" – 2:49 
"Embryonic Journey: Take 3.14159" – 2:28 
"Embryonic Journey: Another One, Two, Three, Four" – 2:31 
"Embryonic Journey: Jorma and Tom One More Take" – 2:34 
"Embryonic Journey: The Perfect Embryonic Journey" – 3:15 
"Embryonic Journey: A MIDI Orchestration Embryonic Journey" – 2:14

Personnel
Jorma Kaukonen – acoustic guitar
Tom Constanten – piano

Production
L. D. Kippel – executive producer, photography
Michael Falzarano – producer
Jan Betts – art
Recorded at Sound Tek Studios, 1780 Broadway, New York

References 

1994 albums
Jorma Kaukonen albums
Relix Records albums